Borjan Canev (born 1973 in Skopje) is a Macedonian conductor trained at the Royal College of Music in London. Back then, he served as Sir Colin Davis' assistant conductor at his 2001 production of Wolfgang Amadeus Mozart's Don Giovanni.

He is the principal conductor of the Makedonska Filharmonija (1999–present) and the Skopje Soloists Chamber Orchestra (2004–present), and the Sofia Philharmonic's principal guest conductor.

Sources
  Makedonska Filharmonija
  Institute for Research and Archiving of Music, Skopje

1973 births
Living people
Macedonian conductors (music)
Male conductors (music)
Musicians from Skopje
Alumni of the Royal College of Music
21st-century conductors (music)
21st-century male musicians